Hundred Visions is an American three piece rock band from Austin, Texas, formed in 2010.  The band has released a number of 7 inches as well as two full length albums, SPITE, released on Pau Wau Records in 2014, and Permanent Basement, released on Slammammals Records in 2012.  Their third full length album, Brutal Pueblo, will be released in December 2016.

Hundred Visions has played Levitation (Austin Psych Fest), Fun Fun Fun Fest, SXSW, and CMJ. The band has toured with American Sharks, White Denim, and Okkervil River.

Members
 Ben Maddox - vocals, guitar
 Wes Turner - bass
 Eric Loftis - drums

Discography
 Permanent Basement, 2012, Slammammals Records
 Spite, October 28, 2014, Pau Wau Records
 Brutal Pueblo, 2016, Burger Records

References

Musical groups from Austin, Texas
Rock music groups from Texas
Musical groups established in 2010
2010 establishments in Texas